Hannah Elizabeth Reynolds (born May 25, 1998) is an American professional soccer player who plays for Kdz. Ereğli Belediye Spor in the Turkish Women's Football Super League.

Early life 
Hannah Elizabeth Reynolds was born to George and Sara Reynolds in Seattle, Washington, on May 25, 1998. She has three elder sisters, Katherine, Elizabeth, and Jen. Katherine is also a professional soccer player.

Youth career 

Reynolds played soccer during her high school years at University Preparatory Academy. She then joined Eastside FC 96 Red in Issaquah, Washington. While playing for Eastside FC 96  Red U15, she was named a member of the "Pacific Northwest Team of the Month for August" by TopDrawerSoccer.com in 2011. She took part at the 2015 US Youth Soccer Region IV Championships. Reynolds won three state champion titles with University Prep. During her college years, she played for the Tufts Jumbos, a NCAA Division III team.

Club career 
In October 2022, Reynolds moved to Turkey and signed with Hatayspor to play in the Women's Super League. After scoring two gaols in eight matches, she transferred to Kdz. Ereğli Belediye Spor in the second half of the 2022-23 Super League season.

References 

1998 births
Living people
Soccer players from Seattle
American expatriate sportspeople in Turkey
Expatriate women's footballers in Turkey
Turkish Women's Football Super League players
Hatayspor (women's football) players
Karadeniz Ereğlispor players
Women's association football defenders
American women's soccer players